Rhyme & Reason (Original Motion Picture Soundtrack) is the soundtrack to Peter Spirer's 1997 documentary film Rhyme & Reason. It was released on January 14, 1997 through Priority Records. The album found a great deal of success, peaking at #16 on the Billboard 200 and #1 on the Top R&B/Hip-Hop Albums chart in the United States.

Track listing

Sample credits
Track 2 contains elements from "The Human Fly" as performed by Lalo Schifrin
Track 9 contains elements from "Go Stetsa I" as performed by Stetsasonic
Track 10 contains samples of "Don't Play That Song (You Lied)" as performed by Ben E. King and of "Ya Slippin'" as performed by KRS-One
Track 12 contains a sample from "More Bounce to the Ounce" by Zapp and an interpolation of "Flashlight" by Parliament

Charts

Weekly charts

Year-end charts

Certifications

See also
List of number-one R&B albums of 1997 (U.S.)

References

External links

1997 soundtrack albums
Documentary film soundtracks
Hip hop soundtracks
Priority Records soundtracks
Albums produced by Guru
Albums produced by KRS-One
Albums produced by MC Eiht
Albums produced by Studio Ton
Albums produced by True Master
Albums produced by Daz Dillinger
Albums produced by Q-Tip (musician)